Edoardo Angelo Martino (20 April 1910 – 5 December 1999) was an Italian Christian Democrats politician. He was a member of the Italian Chamber of Deputies from 1948 to 1963.

He served as a European Commissioner from 1967 to 1970, as Commissioner for External Relations in the Rey Commission.

References 

1910 births
1999 deaths
Christian Democracy (Italy) politicians
Italian European Commissioners
European Commissioners 1967–1970
Members of the Chamber of Deputies (Italy)